Vladimir Maksimovich Salkov (1 April 1937 – 9 July 2020) was a Russian-Ukrainian football manager and defender. He was a Merited Coach of Ukraine (1975) and a Merited Coach of the USSR (1989). He is considered to be one of the most legendary players and managers in the history of Shakhtar Donetsk.

Player's career 
Salkov played for the youth team of FC Shakhtar Donetsk, then for their senior team in 1960–1969. Before, he played for SKVO Orenburg and Krylia Sovetov Kuybyshev. Salkov won the Soviet Cup twice (1961, 1962) with Shakhtar. Salkov played for Krylia Sovetov Kuybyshev and Shakhtar Donetsk.

Coaching 
After finishing his playing career in 1969 Salkov worked in Metallurg Zhdanov at first and later back for his native Shakhtar Donetsk. In 1988, he won the Olympic gold with the Soviet team. He has also managed various clubs from USSR, Russia, and Ukraine and two national teams (USSR and Uzbekistan). Salkov won Olympic gold as an assistant coach with the Soviet team at the 1988 Summer Olympics. In 1980s he led several Soviet national youth football teams. Salkov also was an assistant manager of Uzbekistan national team.

Salkov also was a sporting director at CSKA Moscow (2005–2007).

Honours

As player
Soviet Cup (with Shakhtar Donetsk)
 Champion (2): 1961, 1962

As coach
 1988 Summer Olympics (with Soviet team)
 Olympic gold (1): 1988 (as an assistant)

Ukrainian Cup (with Shakhtar Donetsk)
 Champion (1): 1995

Soviet Top League (all with Shakhtar Donetsk)
 Runner-up, silver (1): 1975
 Runner-up, bronze (1): 1978

Soviet Cup (with Shakhtar Donetsk)
 Finalist (1): 1978

Russian Premier League (with Rotor Volgograd)
 Runner-up, silver (1): 1993

References

External links
Statistics at KLISF 
Profile at RussiaTeam 

1937 births
2020 deaths
Footballers from Donetsk
Ukrainian emigrants to Russia
Soviet footballers
Ukrainian footballers
Russian footballers
Soviet football managers
Russian football managers
Russian expatriate football managers
PFC Krylia Sovetov Samara players
FC Shakhtar Donetsk players
Soviet Top League players
FC Mariupol managers
FC Shakhtar Donetsk managers
FC Torpedo Moscow managers
FC Rotor Volgograd managers
Uzbekistan national football team managers
Soviet Top League managers
Russian Premier League managers
Ukrainian Premier League managers
Merited Coaches of the Soviet Union
Merited Coaches of Ukraine
Ukrainian football managers
Association football defenders
Ukrainian expatriate football managers